Joseph John Tucker (1832 – November 23, 1914) was a Canadian politician.

Born in Chatham, Kent, England, the son of John Tucker, Joseph emigrated to Canada with his father at an early age. He was, for twenty years, the chief surveyor for Lloyds in the East and resided in Shanghai. Tucker commanded a transport vessel during the Crimean War. He was a Lieutenant-Colonel with the 62nd Battalion, Saint John Fusiliers. He was elected to the House of Commons of Canada for the New Brunswick electoral district of City and County of Saint John in the 1896 federal election. A Liberal, he was re-elected in 1900. Tucker was president and partner for the Morning Telegraph Publishing Company and a director of the Saint John Railway Company.

Electoral record

References

1832 births
1914 deaths
English emigrants to pre-Confederation New Brunswick
Liberal Party of Canada MPs
Members of the House of Commons of Canada from New Brunswick